Ivana Reitmayerová (born 4 May 1992) is a Slovak former competitive figure skater. She is the 2008 Ondrej Nepela Memorial champion, 2008 Triglav Trophy silver medalist, and a two-time (2009, 2010) Slovak national champion. She competed at the 2010 Winter Olympics in Vancouver.

Reitmayerová began competing internationally on the junior level in 2005 and on the senior level the following year. She was coached by her mother, Iveta. Her brother, Peter Reitmayer, also competed in figure skating.

Programs

Competitive highlights

References

External links 

 
 Tracings.net profile

Slovak female single skaters
Living people
1992 births
Sportspeople from Košice
Figure skaters at the 2010 Winter Olympics
Olympic figure skaters of Slovakia